Landmark court decisions, in present-day common law legal systems, establish precedents that determine a significant new legal principle or concept, or otherwise substantially affect the interpretation of existing law. "Leading case" is commonly used in the United Kingdom and other Commonwealth jurisdictions instead of "landmark case", as used in the United States.

In Commonwealth countries, a reported decision is said to be a leading decision when it has come to be generally regarded as settling the law of the question involved. In 1914, Canadian jurist Augustus Henry Frazer Lefroy said "a 'leading case' [is] one that settles the law upon some important point".

A leading decision may settle the law in more than one way. It may do so by: 
 Distinguishing a new principle that refines a prior principle, thus departing from prior practice without violating the rule of stare decisis;
 Establishing a "test" (that is, a measurable standard that can be applied by courts in future decisions), such as the Oakes test (in Canadian law) or the Bolam test (in English law).
 Sometimes, with regard to a particular provision of a written constitution, only one court decision has been made. By necessity, until further rulings are made, this ruling is the leading case. For example, in Canada, "[t]he leading case on voting rights and electoral boundary readjustment is Carter. In fact, Carter is the only case of disputed electoral boundaries to have reached the Supreme Court." The degree to which this kind of leading case can be said to have "settled" the law is less than in situations where many rulings have reaffirmed the same principle.

Landmark decisions in Australia 

Decisions in leading cases in Australia have usually been made by the High Court of Australia, although historically some have been made by the Judicial Committee of the Privy Council in London.

Amalgamated Society of Engineers v Adelaide Steamship Co. Ltd. (Engineers' Case) (1920): Rejected the doctrines of implied intergovernmental immunities and reserved State powers and determined that each head of federal power should be interpreted simply on the words of the grant.
Re Judiciary and Navigation Acts (1921): dealt with what is a matter for the court and what the court can hear.
 In 1948, the High Court of Australia found that the Chifley government's legislation to nationalise Australia's private banks was unconstitutional.
 In 1951, the High Court of Australia found that Robert Menzies' attempts to ban the Communist Party of Australia were unconstitutional.
 In Commonwealth v Tasmania (Tasmanian Dams Case), the High Court held that the Commonwealth was able to invoke its external affairs power to give effect to Australia's obligations under international law, including to prevent the construction of the Franklin Dam in a World Heritage Zone. 
 In  Eddie Mabo & Ors v The State of Queensland (No.2) invalidated the declaration of terra nullius.
 Dietrich v The Queen, it was found that Australians accused of serious offences have a limited right to legal representation in order to guarantee a fair trial.
 In Plaintiff M70/2011 v Minister for Immigration and Citizenship (The Malaysian Solution Case) the High Court held that refugees could not be deported to countries that did not meet certain human rights protection standards.
 In Commonwealth v the ACT (Same-Sex Marriage Case) the High Court held that only the Commonwealth had the necessary legislative head of power to reform marriage laws to encompass same-sex marriage.
 In Williams v Commonwealth and Williams v Commonwealth (No 2) (School Chaplains Case) the High Court held that the Commonwealth did not have the necessary constitutional head of legislative power to fund the National School Chaplaincy Programme.
 In Re Canavan (The Citizenship Seven Case), the High Court's earlier ruling in Sykes v Cleary was clarified and it was found that a dual citizen, irrespective of whether they knew about their citizenship status, will be disqualified from sitting in Parliament unless they are irremediably prevented by foreign law from renouncing their foreign citizenship as a result of the operation of s 44(i) of the Australian Constitution. 15 members of the 45th Parliament were either ruled ineligible to serve, or resigned on the basis of holding foreign citizenship.

Landmark decisions in Canada 

There is no universally agreed-to list of "leading decisions" in Canada.

One indication, however, as to whether a case is widely regarded as being "leading" is its inclusion of the ruling in one or more of the series of compilations prepared over the years by various authors. One of the earlier examples is Augustus Henry Frazer Lefroy's Leading Cases in Canadian Constitutional Law, published in 1914. More recently, Peter H. Russell and a changing list of collaborators have published a series of books, including:
 Leading Constitutional Decisions (first published 1965, with several later editions);
 Federalism and the Charter: Leading Constitutional Decisions (published in 1989, co-edited by Russell, F.L. Morton and Rainer Knopff);
 The Court and the Charter: Leading Cases (published in 2008, co-edited by Russell, Morton, Knopff, Thomas Bateman and Janet Hiebert); and
 The Court and the Constitution: Leading Cases (published in 2008, co-edited by Russell, Morton, Knopff, Bateman and Hiebert).

Decisions in leading cases in Canada have usually been made by the Supreme Court of Canada. Prior to the abolition of appeals of Supreme Court decisions in the 1940s, most landmark decisions were made by the Judicial Committee of the Privy Council in London.

Landmark decisions in India 

The Supreme Court of India, which is the highest judicial body in India, has decided many leading cases of Constitutional jurisprudence, establishing Constitution Benches for hearing the same. Given below are a list of some leading cases:
 Kesavananda Bharati Sripadagalvaru & Ors. v. State of Kerala & Anr., (W.P. (C) 135 of 1970), was a case in which the Court formally adopted the Basic structure doctrine.
 Three Judges Cases (in which the Court established precedent regarding appointment of judges while ensuring absolute independence of the judiciary from the Legislature and the Executive):
 S.P. Gupta v. Union of India & Anr. (Transfer Case (civil) 19 of 1981; 1982 2 SCR 365)
 Supreme Court Advocates-on-Record Association & Anr. v. Union of India (W.P. (C)  1303 of 1987)
 In re Special reference 1 of 1998
 Justice K. S. Puttaswamy (Retd.) & Anr. v. Union of India & Ors. (W.P. (C) 494 of 2012), wherein the Court held that Right to Privacy was a fundamental right under the Constitution of India.

Landmark decisions in New Zealand 

Decisions in leading cases in New Zealand were made by the Court of Appeal of New Zealand before the establishment of the Supreme Court of New Zealand, although historically some have been made by the Judicial Committee of the Privy Council in London.

 In 1976, the Wellington Supreme Court in Fitzgerald v Muldoon and Others held that Prime Minister Robert Muldoon had purported to suspend laws in a manner contrary to the Bill of Rights 1689.
 In 1987, the Court of Appeal in New Zealand Maori Council v Attorney-General recognised the principles of the Treaty of Waitangi.
 In 2022, the Supreme Court ruled in Make It 16 Incorporated v Attorney-General that all New Zealand citizens aged 16 and over were entitled to vote, regardless of the law excluding those under 18 from participation.

Landmark decisions in the United Kingdom 

Decisions in leading cases in the United Kingdom have usually been made by the House of Lords, or more recently the Supreme Court of the United Kingdom; in Scotland by the Court of Session or High Court of Justiciary; in England and Wales by the Court of Appeal or the High Court of Justice of England and Wales.

Heydon's Case 76 ER 637 (1584) (Exchequer of Pleas): The first case to use what would come to be called the mischief rule for statutory interpretation.
Darcy v Allein [1603] 77 Eng. Rep. 1260 (King's Bench): (most widely known as The Case of Monopolies): establishing that it was improper for any individual to be allowed to have a monopoly over a trade.
The Case of Prohibitions (1607) (Court of Common Pleas)
Bushel's Case (1670) (Court of Common Pleas): establishing the principle that a judge cannot coerce a jury to convict.
Entick v Carrington [1765] 19 Howell's State Trials 1030: establishing the civil liberties of individuals and limiting the scope of executive power.
Tulk v Moxhay (1848) 41 ER 1143: establishing that in certain cases a restrictive covenant can "run with the land" (i.e., bind a future owner) in equity.
Hadley v Baxendale (1854) 9 Exch. 341 (Court of Exchequer): the extent to which a party in breach of contract is liable for the damages.-
Rylands v Fletcher (1868) LR 3 HL 330: doctrine of strict liability for some inherently dangerous activities.
Foakes v Beer [1884] 9 A.C. 605: the rule that prevents parties from discharging a contractual obligation by part performance.
The Moorcock 14 P.D. 64 (1889): the concept of implied terms in contract law.
Carlill v Carbolic Smoke Ball Company [1893] 1 QB 256: establishing the test for formation of a contract.
Dunlop Pneumatic Tyre v Selfridge and Co. Ltd. [1915] A.C. 847: confirming privity of contract: only a party to a contract can be sued on it. (This principle was later reformed by statute.)
A-G v De Keyser's Royal Hotel Ltd [1920] A.C 508: establishing that the Crown has no right under the royal prerogative to take possession of an owner's land in connection with the defence of the realm without paying compensation, and that a statute in force may prevail to regulate the exercise of an existing prerogative power.
Donoghue v Stevenson [1932] S.C.(H.L.) 31: Lord Atkin established the neighbour principle as the foundation of the modern Scots delict (English tort) of negligence. This case used a wide ratio decidendi, which was held later as obiter, but established the principle of "duty of care.".
Regal (Hastings) Ltd v Gulliver [1942] "UKHL 1," regarding the rule against company "directors" and officers from taking corporate opportunities in violation of their "duty of loyalty" to the company.
Central London Property Trust Ltd v High Trees House Ltd [1947] K.B. 130: doctrine of promissory estoppel.
Associated Provincial Picture Houses Ltd v Wednesbury Corporation [1948] 1 KB 223: establishing the concept of Wednesbury unreasonableness .
Hedley Byrne v Heller [1963] 2 All E.R. 575: establishing liability for pure economic loss, absent any contract, arising from a negligent statement.
Fagan v Metropolitan Police Commissioner [1969] 1 QB 43: the requirement for concurrence of actus reus and mens rea to establish a criminal offence.
Ramsay v IRC [1982] A. C. 300: establishing a doctrine that ignores "for" tax purposes the purported effect of a pre-ordained series of transactions into which there are inserted steps that have no (commercial purpose) apart from the avoidance of a liability to tax.
Furniss v Dawson [1984] A.C. 474: establishing that tax can be levied on the results of a composite transaction, even if steps that are only there for the purpose of avoiding tax (do not) cancel each other out.
Council of Civil Service Unions v Minister for the Civil Service [1984] UKHL 9: the use of the royal prerogative is subject to judicial review.
Factortame case [1990]: the European Court of Justice ruled that the House of Lords was required to suspend an "Act" of Parliament that infringed EC law.
R v R [1991]: the House of Lords invalidated the defence of marital rape to reflect a changing view in society.
R v Brown  [1993] UKHL 19: Consent is not a valid defence to a charge of actual bodily harm or common assault.
A and others v Secretary of State for the Home Department [2004] UKHL 56: Indefinite detention without trial was found to be incompatible with European Convention on Human Rights
R v Chaytor [2010] UKSC 52: Parliamentary privilege does not protect Members of Parliament from criminal prosecution, not even if the alleged crime was undertaken in the course their parliamentary duties.
R (Miller) v Secretary of State for Exiting the European Union: [2017] UKSC 5: The Government may not use prerogative powers to undertake action that would remove rights previously granted under primary legislation, and instead must introduce primary legislation to undertake such an action.
R (Miller) v The Prime Minister and Cherry v Advocate General for Scotland [2019] UKSC 41: The prerogative power of prorogation is subject to judicial review; prorogation is unlawful if it has the effect of frustrating Parliament's constitutional obligation without a reasonable justification.

Landmark decisions in the United States

Landmark cases in the United States come most frequently (but not exclusively) from the Supreme Court of the United States. United States Courts of Appeals may also make such decisions, particularly if the Supreme Court chooses not to review the case, or adopts the holding of the court below. Although many cases from state supreme courts are significant in developing the law of that state, only a few are so revolutionary that they announce standards that many other state courts then choose to follow.

International courts

List of European Court of Human Rights judgments
List of European Court of Justice rulings
List of International Court of Justice cases

See also 
 Case citation
 Lists of case law
 Test case (law)

References

External links
Supreme Court Landmark Decisions – Cornell Law School
Links to Additional Information on Supreme Court Landmarks Decisions – Constitutional Rights Foundation

Judgment (law)